{{Bible chapter|letname= Ezra 9 |previouslink= Ezra 8 |previousletter=chapter 8 |nextlink= Ezra 10|nextletter= chapter 10 |book=Book of Ezra |biblepart=Old Testament | booknum= 15 |category= Ketuvim | filename= 109.Ezra_Reads_the_Law_to_the_People.jpg | size=250px |caption=<div style="width: 250px; text-align: center; line-height: 1em">"Ezra Reads the Law to the People, one of Gustave Doré's illustrations for La Grande Bible de Tours</div>}}

Ezra 9 is the ninth chapter of the Book of Ezra in the Old Testament of the Christian Bible, or the book of Ezra-Nehemiah in the Hebrew Bible, which treats the book of Ezra and book of Nehemiah as one book. Jewish tradition states that Ezra is the author of Ezra-Nehemiah as well as the Book of Chronicles, but modern scholars generally accept that a compiler from the 5th century BCE (the so-called "Chronicler") is the final author of these books. The section comprising chapters 7 to 10 mainly describes the activities of Ezra the scribe and the priest. This chapter and the next deal with the problem of intermarriage, starting with the introduction of the crisis, then Ezra's public mourning and prayer of shame. J. Gordon McConville suggests that this chapter is central to the Book of Ezra because it draws a sharp contrast between what the people of God ought to be and what they actually are.

Text
This chapter is divided into 15 verses. The original text of this chapter is in  Hebrew language.

Textual witnesses
Some early manuscripts containing the text of this chapter in Hebrew are of the Masoretic Text, which includes Codex Leningradensis (1008).

There is also a translation into Koine Greek known as the Septuagint, made in the last few centuries BCE. Extant ancient manuscripts of the Septuagint version include Codex Sinaiticus (S; BHK: S; 4th century; only Ezra 9:9 to end), Codex Vaticanus (B; B; 4th century), and Codex Alexandrinus (A; A; 5th century).

An ancient Greek book called 1 Esdras containing some parts of 2 Chronicles, Ezra and Nehemiah  is included in most editions of the Septuagint and is placed before the single book of Ezra–Nehemiah (which is titled in Greek). 1 Esdras 8:68-90 is an equivalent of Ezra 9 (Repentance from mixed marriages).Jewish Encyclopedia: Esdras, Books of: I Esdras

The report (9:1–2)
Some Jewish leaders in Jerusalem reported to Ezra about 'the misconduct of various leaders and members of the community'.

Verse 2
 "For they have taken some of their daughters as wives for themselves and their sons, so that the holy seed is mixed with the peoples of those lands. Indeed, the hand of the leaders and rulers has been foremost in this trespass."
Verse 1 lists the origins of the mixed marriage partners as Canaanites, Hittites, Perizzites, Jebusites, Ammonites, Moabites, Egyptians and Amorites.

The response (9:3–5)
Hearing the report, Ezra responded with a "public act of contrition" in his function as "the official representative of the community".

Verse 3And when I heard this thing, I rent my garment and my mantle, and plucked off the hair of my head and of my beard, and sat down astonied."Rent my garment and my mantle": Here Ezra is rending (tearing) his 'under-garment' or 'tunic' (Hebrew ) and the 'long loose robe' that he was wearing. The act of rending one's clothes is frequently mentioned in the Hebrew Bible as a sign of grief, such as:
 Reuben rent his 'clothes' (plural of ) on not finding Joseph
 Jacob rent his 'garments' (plural of ) on seeing Joseph's blood-stained coat
 Joseph's brethren rent their clothers (plural of ) when the cup was found in Benjamin's sack
 Joshua rent his 'clothes' (plural of ) after the repulse at Ai
 Jephthah rent his 'clothes' (plural of ) on meeting his daughter
 the messenger from the field of Ziklag came with his clothes (plural of ) rent (cf. )
 Job rent his mantle on hearing of his children's death
 Job's friends rent their mantle (‘’) when they came to visit him. 
The action also denoted 'horror' on receiving shocking intelligence or hearing shocking words, such as: 
 Hezekiah and his ministers rent their clothes (plural of ) after Rabshakeh's speech
Mordecai rent his clothes (plural of '') on hearing of Haman's determination
 See also ; ; .
In the New Testament is also recorded:
 the High-priest rent his garments on hearing the testimony of Jesus.

The prayer (9:6–15)
Being a leader of the community, Ezra offered a "public prayer of confession" which is "sincere, personal, emotional and forthright". The Jerusalem Bible describes the prayer of Ezra as "also a sermon".

See also
 Ammonites
 Amorites
 Canaanites
 Egyptians
 Hittites
 Jebusites
 Jerusalem
 Moabites
 Perizzites
 Related Bible parts:Ezra 8, Ezra 10, Nehemiah 8

Notes

Citations

Sources

Further reading
Blenkinsopp, Joseph, "Ezra-Nehemiah: A Commentary" (Eerdmans, 1988)
Blenkinsopp, Joseph, "Judaism, the first phase" (Eerdmans, 2009)
Coggins, R.J., "The Books of Ezra and Nehemiah" (Cambridge University Press, 1976)
Ecker, Ronald L., "Ezra and Nehemiah", Ecker's Biblical Web Pages, 2007.
Grabbe, L.L., "Ezra-Nehemiah" (Routledge, 1998)
Pakkala, Juha, "Ezra the scribe: the development of Ezra 7–10 and Nehemiah 8" (Walter de Gryter, 2004)*Grabbe, L.L., "A history of the Jews and Judaism in the Second Temple Period, Volume 1" (T&T Clark, 2004)
Throntveit, Mark A. (1992) "Ezra-Nehemiah". John Knox Press

External links
 Jewish translations:
 Ezra - Chapter 9 (Judaica Press) translation [with Rashi's commentary] at Chabad.org
 Christian translations:
 Online Bible at GospelHall.org (ESV, KJV, Darby, American Standard Version, Bible in Basic English)
 Book of Ezra Chapter 9. Bible Gateway

09